The 1995 European Junior Canoe Slalom Championships  were the inaugural edition of the European Junior Canoe Slalom Championships. The event took place in Liptovský Mikuláš, Slovakia from 13 to 16 July 1995 under the auspices of the European Canoe Association (ECA) at the Ondrej Cibak Whitewater Slalom Course. A total of 8 medal events took place.

Medal summary

Men

Canoe

Kayak

Women

Kayak

Medal table

References

External links
European Canoe Association

European Junior and U23 Canoe Slalom Championships
European Junior and U23 Canoe Slalom Championships